Dear Nanny is a 1986 Spanish drama film directed and written by José Luis Borau and starring Imperio Argentina, Alfredo Landa and Carmen Maura. It is scored by Jacobo Durán Loriga. José Luis Borau was nominated to a Goya Award for Best Original Screenplay and Miguel Rellán won the Goya Award for Best Supporting Actor in the 1987 edition.

Cast

References

External links
 

1986 drama films
1986 films
Spanish drama films
Films directed by José Luis Borau
Films shot in Madrid
Films set in Madrid
Films featuring a Best Supporting Actor Goya Award-winning performance